The Big Sky Conference men's basketball tournament is the conference championship tournament in men's basketball for the Big Sky Conference. The event has been held annually since 1976, the conference's thirteenth year.

The tournament winner earns a berth in the NCAA Division I tournament.

Format and host sites
For the Big Sky's first twelve seasons, it did not have a conference tournament. Starting with its fifth season of  the regular season champion received a berth in the West regional of the NCAA tournament.  an unscheduled tiebreaker playoff was held; the two had identical records (conference & overall) and each had won at home to split the season series; visiting Idaho State prevailed at Montana in the Tuesday night playoff.

For the tournament's first eight editions (1976–1983), only the top four teams (of eight) in the conference standings participated. The tournament expanded to eight teams in 1984, then scaled back to six in 1989. Before 2016, when the tournament moved to a predetermined neutral site, it was often hosted by the regular season champion, but not always. If two or more teams tied for the regular season title, all were declared co-champions, but hosting rights were determined by a tiebreaker procedure. The first tournament in which the regular season champion did not host was in 1985.

Since the 2016 tournament, all full conference members (currently 10) have participated (barring NCAA sanctions or self-imposed postseason bans, the latter of which kept Northern Colorado out of the 2017 tournament), and the tournament is held at a predetermined site. The first such site to host was the Reno Events Center in Reno, Nevada, which hosted from 2016–2018.

On September 18, 2017, the Big Sky announced that its men's and women's tournaments would relocate in 2019 to Boise, Idaho; the initial contract runs for three years at CenturyLink Arena, through 2021.

History of the tournament finals

Finals performance by school

 Current members of the Big Sky Conference  are highlighted in yellow.
 Boise State was a member for 26 years (1970–96), Nevada for 13 years (1979–92), Southern Utah	for 10 years (2012-2022).
 Charter member Idaho was out of the conference for 18 years (1996–2014).

Broadcasters

Television

Radio

See also
Big Sky Conference women's basketball tournament

References

 
Recurring sporting events established in 1976